The fornices of the vagina (sing. fornix of the vagina or fornix vaginae) are the superior portions of the vagina, extending into the recesses created by the vaginal portion of cervix. The word  is Latin for 'arch'.

Structure
There are four named fornices (two primary) according to their anatomical position:
The posterior fornix is the larger recess, behind the cervix. It is close to the recto-uterine pouch.
There are three smaller recesses in front and at the sides:
the anterior fornix is close to the vesico-uterine pouch.
the two lateral fornices.

Sexual
During sexual intercourse in the missionary position, the tip of the penis reaches the anterior fornix, while in the rear-entry position it reaches the posterior fornix. 

The fornices appear to be close to one reported erogenous zone, the cul-de-sac, which is near the posterior fornix.

See also
G-spot

References

External links
 
  – "The Female Pelvis: The Vagina"
  – "Female Reproductive System: cervix, longitudinal"
 

Vagina